The Maztica Trilogy is a set of 3 fantasy novels set in the Forgotten Realms campaign setting of the Dungeons & Dragons fantasy role-playing game.

The series were written by Douglas Niles, and the books are:
 Ironhelm (1990)
 Viperhand (1990)
 Feathered Dragon (1991)

The books are essentially a translation of the Spanish conquest of what is now Mexico in the 16th Century to the Forgotten Realms world.  

The name 'Maztica' is itself a portmanteau of "Maya" and "Aztec", two major civilizations in Central America.

The plot of the trilogy closely follows real-life events. The main character, Cordell, is similar in name to real-life conquistador Hernán Cortés. The conquistador analogs in this case worship the deity Helm and originate from the empire of Amn in the Forgotten Realms. The states of Maztica resemble the Aztecs and other mesoamericans in that:
 they have Stone Age technology
 they worship many gods and offer human sacrifices
 they build large stone pyramids
 there is a warrior class with particular uniforms
 there is one powerful civilization dominating the continent, from which some tribes are independent and others subjugated

The principal difference is the existence of magic in the Dungeons & Dragons fantasy world.

External links
 http://www.worldcat.org/search?qt=worldcat_org&q=Maztica+Trilogy&submit=Search
 http://www.o-love.net/realms/head_maz.html

Fantasy novel trilogies
Forgotten Realms novel series
Novels by Douglas Niles